Nitham Oru Vaanam is a 2022 Indian Tamil-language romantic drama film written and directed by Ra. Karthik in his directorial debut. The film stars Ashok Selvan and Ritu Varma with Aparna Balamurali and Shivathmika Rajashekar in the principal roles. Gopi Sundar composed the film's music and cinematography was performed by Vidhu Ayyana. The film was announced in January 2017, but went through a change of cast, and was relaunched in June 2021. The film was released on 4 November 2022 and received positive reviews from critics.

Plot
The film revolves around Arjun, a young man with OCD. This results in him being rather closed off and seemingly rude to most of the people and happenings around him, alongside a strong dislike for trying anything new that he’s not comfortable with. But he had a habit of imagining himself as the protagonist in any story that he is reading. After a long time, he meets Janani, a woman who he thought understands him and starts to develop feelings for her. Arjun-Janani's marriage preparation goes really well until due to some circumstances, Janani reconciles with her ex-boyfriend, resulting in the calling off of their wedding, which  causes depression in Arjun. To help him overcome this hurdle, Arjun’s doctor treats him, advising him to read the short stories that she had written about two couples—Veera-Meenakshi and Mathi-Prabha. This results in three distinct story arcs.

Veerappan-Meenakshi story arc 
Veerappan alias Veera and Meenakshi is a love marriage couple where Veera is a civil engineer and Meenakshi is a mechanical engineer who plays basketball for passion. They both share a wonderful life with each other and love their counterpart a lot. During a rainy day, a pregnant Meenakshi is left alone in her home, while Veera goes out regarding his building, but  there, he encounters a tragic accident and then the story abruptly ends. As usual, Arjun who imagined himself in place of Veera is left clueless and angry as to what happened to Veera. He asks the doctor about the remaining story and she asks him to read the other diary for knowing the answers. When he started reading, he finds that diary has story of Mathi-Prabha.

Mathivathani-Prabhakaran story arc 
Mathivathani alias Mathi, a care free girl who wishes for a love marriage, runs away the night before marriage. On the way, she meets Prabhakaran alias Prabha (who is also portrayed by Ashok Selvan) with whom she travels in a car but later comes to know that he consumed poison because of love failure. She admits him in hospital while Mathi's father comes to hospital looking for her. He asks Prabha to tie wedding thread around Mathi's neck. When Prabha is about to do so, Mathi falls unconscious with her nose bleeding. Then, the story abruptly ends. 

Arjun desperate to find answers, goes to the doctor's house to confront her. But she says that these both the stories are real life stories and gives address of real Meenakshi-Veera who are in Kolkata and Mathi-Prabha who are in Himachal Pradesh. Arjun decides to meet them in real to know what happened next in their lives.

While Arjun is in his journey, Subhadra alias Subha accompanies him. First they go to Kolkata to meet Meenakshi to learn the truth, it is there that they meet Meenakshi and she narrates the rest of the story that Veera died in the building crash. But instead of feeling sad and hopeless she feels motivated and takes her newborn baby to Kolkata to pursue her basketball career. Now she is a basketball coach. Arjun who feels disappointed, decides to call off but Subha forces to meet Mathi-Prabha and then decide for himself. So they continue their journey.

There, we come to know Subha's backstory too.

Subha's Backstory (parallels) arc 
For some time, we get to know about  who was in a relationship for two years. But he dumped her for another girl. Later he marries that girl and buys a house. Subha is desperate to confront him and ask him the proper and logical reason for breaking up with her but never gets the guts to do so.

Later they go to Himachal Pradesh to meet the second pair. There are accompanied by Prabha's colleague who tells that Prabha alias Prabhakaran is the Deputy Commissioner of Coimbatore and very jovial to everybody. In a daily routine round the city, he stumbles across Mathi and feels instantly smitten by her. Later asks Mathi's hand of marriage to her father, Senniappan, with whom he plots a plan to make her agree along with his consent. Later when the plan goes successful so far, Mathi falls unconscious and later comes to know that she has cancer. Then he continues to tell that even though Mathi got cancer and Prabha knew it, they both were still happy and together with each other. Later when the duo meet Mathi and Prabha, they talk to each other, Prabha tells Arjun that we have to accept some things in life and move on.

Arjun, who changes completely because of both the stories transforms into a different person, starting to admire small things and staying happy always. Later Arjun takes Subha to her ex boyfriend's house and makes her confront him, to which Subha slaps him and breaks his car.

In the chase from Subha's ex, Arjun confesses his feelings for Subha and Subha reciprocates. The movie ends there as they both run from her boyfriend.

Cast 
 Ashok Selvan as Arjun
 Ashok Selvan also portrayed as alias "Veera" and as alias "Prabhakaran" 
 Jiiva as Real Prabhakaran (Cameo)
 Ritu Varma as Subhadra aka Subha (Voice-over by Krithika Nelson)
 Aparna Balamurali as alias Madhi
 Eesha Rebba as Real Madhi (Cameo)
 Shivathmika Rajashekar as alias Meenakshi
 Sshivada as Real Meenakshi (Cameo)
 Vinsu Rachel as Janani, Arjun’s ex-fiance
 Arjunan as Shiva, Janani's boyfriend turned husband
 Abhirami as Doctor Krishnaveni
 Kaali Venkat as Prabha’s assistant 
 Azhagam Perumal as Seniyappan, Madhi’s father
 Kalyani Natarajan as Arjun’s mother
 Mathew Varghese as Arjun’s father
 Badava Gopi as Arjun’s Boss
 Mona Bedre as Arjun’s office colleague

Production

Development 
The film was first announced to the media in January 2017, when it was reported that Dulquer Salmaan would work on a Tamil film by debutant director R. Karthik, to be produced by Kenanya Films. Described as "romantic entertainer-cum-road movie", Karthik stated that the film would have four lead actresses and that discussions for roles were held with Nivetha Pethuraj and Megha Akash. Other actresses including Akshara Haasan, Nazriya Nazim and Parvathy were also considered for the film, though none of them were officially signed on for the project. In June 2017, Karthik stated that the casting process for the lead actresses was still ongoing, and that there were no plans of making a Malayalam version of the film, despite speculation. George C. Williams, Sreekar Prasad and debutant Dheena Dayalan joined the team as the film's cinematographer, editor and music composer respectively, while the director stated that the team had planned to begin production by December 2017. Considering the film's theme of travel, Karthik revealed that the film would be shot across locations including Chennai, Pollachi, Coimbatore, Chandigarh and Nainital. Actress Shalini Pandey joined the cast of the film during October 2017, but production was delayed as a result of Kenanya Films' financial problems.

After a brief delay, the first look poster of the film was released in June 2018, confirming the identity of the principal crew members. Karthik noted that he initially wanted to title the film as Vaanam – after the sky, which changes its form and colour regularly, like the lead character – but the presence of an earlier film prompted him to choose Vaan. The film was launched in December 2018, with a ceremony held in Chennai attended by Dulquer and crew members.

Casting 
At the event, Kalyani Priyadarshan and Kriti Kharbanda were announced as two of the lead actresses, with Karthik suggesting that the storyline travels from "Chennai to Kolkata" and that the film would be "along the lines of Jab We Met (2007)". Priya Bhavani Shankar also joined the film's cast in February 2019. However, the production studio's continued financial problems and the COVID-19 pandemic prompted the film to be continually delayed and later dropped.

In late June 2021, Viacom18 Studios in association with Rise East Entertainment, relaunched Karthik's directorial debut, with the title being changed to Nitham Oru Vaanam, from Vaan. Several changes were also made to the cast and crew owing to date clashes. Ashok Selvan replaced Dulquer in the lead role, while actresses Ritu Varma, Aparna Balamurali and Shivathmika Rajashekar were cast in the leading female roles. Music composer Gopi Sundar and editor Anthony also joined the project, replacing Dheena Dayalan and Sreekar Prasad. Cinematographer George C. Williams was replaced by Vidhu Ayyana due to the extensive delays and schedule conflicts.

Music

The music of the film is composed by Gopi Sundar.

Release

Theatrical 
The film was released theatrically on 4 November 2022 along with Jiiva’s Coffee with Kadhal and Pradeep Ranganathan’s Love Today.

Home media 
The digital streaming rights of the film have been acquired by Netflix. The film had its digital premiere on the streaming platform from 2 December 2022.

Reception
The film received positive reviews from critics.

M. Suganth of The Times of India rated the film 3 out of 5 stars and wrote "By the end, just as we expect, Arjun learns to be positive". Tanmayi Sharma of Pinkvilla rated 3 out of 5 and called the film "A subtle drama with watch-worthy performances". Navein Darshan of Cinema Express rated the film 3.5 out of 5 stars and wrote "Despite being made on a massive canvas, NOV is a simple film that conveys a simple message." Bhuvanesh Chandar of The Hindu called the film "A tribute to the kids within us who saw towels as capes, and not many films manage to do that as elegantly as this one". Ashwin Ram of Moviecrow rated the film 2.75 out of 5 and wrote "Admirable presentation in terms of technicality and the performances of the artists are also impressive, the core content had the potential to deliver a feel-good flick". A critic from Indiaglitz rated the film 3.5 out of 5 and wrote "Go for this variety romantic entertainer whose strong message will touch you". A critic from Dinamalar rated the film 3 out of 5 stars.

References

External links 
 

2022 films
Indian romantic drama films
Films shot in Chennai